The following is a list of Ghanaian politicians, both past and present.



A
Abavana, Lawrence Rosario
Abdulai, Mohammed Mubarak see below Ras Mubarak
Albert Abongo
Acheampong, Ignatius Kutu 
Addy, Mark Diamond
Aferi, Nathan Apea
Aggudey, George
Ahwoi, Kwamena
Aidoo, Joseph
Ako-Adjei, Ebenezer
Akuffo, Fred
Akufo-Addo, Nana Addo Dankwa
Afrifa, Akwasi
Amofa, Owuraku
Ampaw, Gibson Dokyi
Amponsah, Reginald Reynolds  
Anin, Patrick Dankwa
Ankrah, Joseph Arthur
Annan, Daniel Francis
Annan, Kofi
Arkaah, Kow Nkensen
Asamoah, Obed
Atta-Mills, John
Awoonor-Williams, R.A.
Ayannah, Alhaji
Amoako, Richard Nana
Anbataayela Bernard Mornah

B
Baffour, R.P.
Baah, Kwame, R.M.
Barima, Yaw
Bernasko, Frank
Bilson, John
Boafo, Sampson
Boahen, Albert Adu
Boateng, Kwaku
Botsio, Kojo
Busia, Kofi Abrefa

C
Casely-Hayford, Archie
Casely-Hayford, J. E.
Chinebuah, Isaac

D
Delle Nminyem Edmund
Danquah, Joseph Boakye (J.B.)
Darko, Kwabena
Dery, Ambrose
Dombo, Simon Diedong
Dzamesi, Kofi

E
Edumadze, Isaac
Egala, Imoru
Erskine, Emmanuel
Esseku, Haruna

F
Felli, Roger

G
Gambila, Boniface
Gbedemah, Komla Agbeli
Gbeho, James Victor
Grant, A. G. ("Paa")

H
Hagan, George
Harlley, J.W.K.
Casely-Hayford, Joseph

J
Jantuah, Franklin Adubobi
Jantuah, Kwame Sanaa-Poku
Johnson, Joseph W.S. de Graft

K
Kufuor, John Agyekum

L
Lartey, Daniel Augustus
Limann, Hilla

M
Mahama, Aliu
Mahama, Edward
Mahama, Ibrahim
Mate Kole, Emmanuel
Mensah, James Van Leuven
Mensah Sarbah, John
Muntaka, Mohammed Mubarak

N
Nikoi, Gloria Amon
Nkrumah, Kwame
Nyanteh, Kwame
Nyanteh, Larbi Kwame

O
Obetsebi-Lamptey, Emmanuel
Obetsebi-Lamptey, Jake
Ofori-Atta, William
Ollennu, Nii Amaa 
Owusu, Victor
Owusu-Agyeman, Hackman
Owusu-Yaw, Joseph

Q
Quaison-Sackey, Alex
Quaye, Sheikh I. C.

R
Rawlings, Jerry John
Ras Mubarak

S
Saddique, Boniface
Safo-Adu, Kwame
Seinti, Nana Kwadwo
Spio-Garbrah, Ekwow

T
Tanoh, Augustus Obuadum "Goosie"
Terlabi, Ebenezer Okletey

V
Vanderpuije, Alfred
Vanderpuye, Edwin Nii Lante
Vanderpuye, Isaac Nii Djanmah

W
Welbeck, Nathaniel Azarco
Wereko-Brobby, Charles

Y
Yahaya, Moses Amadu
Tali, Yakubu

References

 

Ghana
Politicians